The 1992 United States Senate election in Alaska was held on November 3, 1992. Incumbent Republican United States Senator Frank Murkowski sought re-election to a third term in the United States Senate. Tony Smith, the Democratic nominee and a former Commissioner of Economic Development, won his party's nomination in a crowded primary and faced off against Murkowski in the general election. Though Murkowski was held to a lower vote percentage than he received six years prior, he was ultimately re-elected.

Open primary

Candidates

Democratic
 Tony Smith, former Alaska Commissioner of Economic Development
 William L. Hensley, former Alaska State Senator
 Michael Beasley, perennial candidate
 Joseph A. Sonneman, perennial candidate
 Frank Vondersaar, perennial candidate

Green
 Mary Jordan

Results

Republican primary

Candidates
 Frank Murkowski, incumbent United States Senator since 1981
 Jed Whittaker, commercial fisherman

Results

General election

Results

See also
 1992 United States Senate elections

References

Alaska
1992
1992 Alaska elections